Robert Marcello (born Robert Wendelstam Lovbom, September 9, 1977, Örebro, Sweden) is a neoclassical metal, rock and jazz/fusion guitar player who replaced Andy Timmons as the lead guitarist of the band Danger Danger in 2003. Kee Marcello, his brother, was guitarist of Europe band.

He has also played in the bands Ironhorse, Obsession, Twenty 4 Seven, and Marcello-Vestry.
In late 2009 he was also a stand-in guitarist in the 1980s band House of Lords.

Rob plays Caparison Guitars and is sponsored by Boss Corporation, he is featured as the guitarist for many of their pedal demonstration videos.

Discography

With Iron Horse
 Iron Horse (2001)

With Twenty 4 Seven
 Destination Everywhere (2002)

With Danger Danger
 Live and Nude (2005)
 Revolve (2009)

With Marcello-Vestry
 Marcello-Vestry (2008)

With Laney's Legion
 Laney's Legion (2014)

With Shotgun
 Live at decadencia drive (2016) (Shotgun Messiah's first record played almost entirely live with half the original band- Zinny Zan and Stixx)

With The Defiants
 Self titled (2016) 
 Zokusho (2019)

References 

Danger Danger members
American heavy metal guitarists
Living people
1977 births